Identity V is a free-to-play asymmetrical multiplayer survival horror game developed and published by Chinese company NetEase. It was released in July 2018 for mobile devices. It is available on the iOS App Store, Android Google Play Store, and Windows computers. The game follows a detective named Orpheus as he unravels the mystery behind a mysterious killing game within a manor. 
The gameplay is structured around five players participating in competitive matches where one of them is tasked with eliminating the other players before they fulfill objectives and escape.

Gameplay

Basic gameplay
Quick Matches and Rank Matches are game modes in which five players participate. These five players are divided into two roles: one player acts as the Hunter, while the other four players act as Survivors. The Survivors are classified into four different categories: Decode types, Assist types, Contain types, and Rescue types.  

The objective of the Hunter is to locate and eliminate all the Survivors before they can escape. To achieve this, the Hunter must chase each Survivor individually and then eliminate them by placing them on a Rocket Chair. Meanwhile, the Survivors aim to escape through two exit gates by decoding five Cipher Machines and entering the password, or through the dungeon if there is only one Survivor left with at least two cipher machines decoded.

The Hunter wins the match by eliminating at least three Survivors, while the Survivors win if three of them can escape from the exit gate. The Survivors can rescue their teammates from the Rocket Chairs before the elimination process is over. Survivors can be placed on the Rocket Chair twice by the Hunter, and on their third attempt, they will be eliminated from the game. In the event that two Survivors are eliminated and two have escaped, the match will end in a tie.

Once eliminated, players have the option to spectate their teammates in-game.

Rewards vary based on the game mode. 

There are various characters to choose from, each having their own abilities in-game. Hunters are given the ability to choose from "Secondary Skills", which are talents that may boost the Hunter during the match. There are a total of seven Secondary Skills, each having a unique ability. Unlocking new characters requires Clues, which are obtained through playing matches and finishing quests. Up to two characters from both factions are available for free to use on each day.

Other game modes
Other game modes have different rules. 

In Duo Hunters, two Hunters team up against a group of eight Survivors. This game mode features telephone booths from which characters of both factions can purchase unique items.

Blackjack plays in the style of the card game Blackjack, with a different player becoming a Hunter in each round.

In Tarot, a team of three Survivors (two Squires and a King) and one Hunter (playing as their team's Knight) face off against another team of the same composition, whose goal is to eliminate the opposing King before their rivals do. A special version, called Crystal Ball Tarot, gives certain characters temporary buffs through the activation of crystal balls.

A fourth mode added in 2021, known as Chasing Shadows, features six Survivors who have to race against each other in an obstacle course.

A fifth mode added in August 2022, called Frenzy Rhapsody, features six Survivors split into two teams and incorporates Dodgeball elements into gameplay.

Single Training allows players from both factions to teach themselves the mechanics of the game and character abilities. There are features such as teleporting to the Hunter, resetting pallets, pausing movement, etc.

Ranked matches 
Identity V features two different ranking systems, in the form of Character Points and Tier Divisions. Both are used only in Ranked Matches, available at specific time slots during the day.

Character Points are earned by playing ranked matches while using a specific character, and are used to determine one's spot on the leader boards. Character Points are specific to each character and may slowly decrease over time. Character Points will also be reset when a new Season arrives. Badges can be earned for a specific character depending on how much points are earned.

Identity V also features eight Tiers split into subdivisions, which players can be sent up and down depending on their performance. Winning Ranked matches earns Rank Points and losing loses Rank Points. Once a certain number of Rank Points is reached, the player can go up to the next subdivision if they gain Rank Points in their next ranked match. The tier bracket the player ends up in will determine what reward they get once the season ends. Similar to Character Points, Tier Divisions are reset when a new Season arrives.

Alongside normal Rank Matches, players can participate in Five Players ranking matches, available at specific time slots during weekends. Five Players ranking mode uses a different set of Tiers and subdivisions, but otherwise retains the same rules as normal Rank Matches.

Persona 
"Intrinsic Persona Web", also known as Persona, gives both factions the ability to have extra talents during matches. The current max points allowed to be used is 120, whereas points can be obtained by playing normal matches. Different personas take up a different amount of points and oftentimes allow players to explore their character's potential. Players are allowed to create a maximum of 17 different persona builds and can reset/delete personas as well.

Setting
The player initially assumes the role of Orpheus, an amnesiac detective who, on a case of a missing child, arrives at the Oletus Manor, the main setting of the game. The Oletus Manor is a large manor owned by a mysterious individual that holds "games" of the Hunter and the hunted. Throughout the duration of his stay, "Orpheus" collects evidence from written records, or "diaries", allowing him to visualize "games" from a participant's perspective.

On October 28, 2021, NetEase released a major expansion pack called "Time of Reunion" that further explores the story line, particularly Orpheus's past and his involvement in the manor games.

Another story expansion pack, "Ashes of Memory", has been announced.

Collaborations
The game is somewhat notable for its crossover events, usually with media franchises containing elements of the horror or murder mystery genres.

Identity V has collaborated with video game franchises Danganronpa and Persona, the film Edward Scissorhands, and the manga/anime series The Promised Neverland, Death Note, Junji Ito's Tomie, Mitsuji Kamata, Bungo Stray Dogs, and Case Closed.

From June to July 2022, Identity V featured a crossover event with the Chinese television series Link Click. Identity V has also collaborated with the game Project Zero II, with the crossover launching in November 2022 and continuing into that December.

There are also many China Server Exclusive Crossovers, such as with Crazy Alien, McDonald's, and KFC.

Reception

Dave Aubrey of Pocket Gamer gave it a 3.5-star of 5 stars review, saying that the game is "well made, well-polished, and pretty darn fun."

References

External links 
 Official Website (English)

2018 video games
Android (operating system) games
Asymmetrical multiplayer video games
Gacha games
Horror video games
Survival horror video games
IOS games
NetEase games
Video games developed in China
Windows games